In Sweden, the standard time is Central European Time (CET; UTC+01:00). Daylight saving time is observed from the last Sunday in March (02:00 CET) to the last Sunday in October (03:00 CEST). Sweden adopted CET in 1900.

Time notation 

Times are written with the 24-hour clock, with full stops as separators (although colons are sometimes used instead of full stops).

IANA time zone database 
In the IANA time zone database, Sweden is given Europe/Stockholm.

See also 
Time in Europe
List of time zones by country
List of time zones by UTC offset

References

External links 
Current time in Sweden at Time.is
Time in Sweden at Lonely Planet